Lotus Cars Limited is a British automotive company headquartered in Norfolk, England which manufactures sports cars and racing cars noted for their light weight and fine handling characteristics.

Lotus was previously involved in Formula One racing, via Team Lotus, winning the Formula One World Championship seven times.

Lotus Cars was founded and owned for many years by Colin Chapman. After his death and a period of financial instability, it was bought by General Motors, then Romano Artioli and DRB-HICOM through its subsidiary Proton. It is currently majority owned by Chinese multinational Geely, with Etika Automotive as a minority shareholder.

The engineering consultancy firm Lotus Engineering, an offshoot of Lotus Cars, has facilities in the United Kingdom, United States, China, and Malaysia.

Notable Lotus cars include the Lotus Seven, the Lotus Esprit and the Lotus Elan.

History

Early years 
The company was formed in 1952 as Lotus Engineering Ltd. by engineers Colin Chapman and Colin Dare, both graduates of University College, London, but had earlier origins in 1948 when Chapman built his first racing car in a garage. The four letters in the middle of the logo stand for the initials of company founder, Anthony Colin Bruce Chapman.  When the logo was created, Colin Chapman's original partners Michael and Nigel Allen were led to believe that the letters stood for Colin Chapman and the Allen Brothers.

The first factory was situated in old stables behind the Railway Hotel in Hornsey, North London. Team Lotus, which was split off from Lotus Engineering in 1954, was active and competitive in Formula One racing from 1958 to 1994. The Lotus Group of Companies was formed in 1959. This was made up of Lotus Cars Limited and Lotus Components Limited, which focused on road cars and customer competition car production, respectively. Lotus Components Limited became Lotus Racing Limited in 1971 but the newly renamed entity ceased operation in the same year.

The company moved to a purpose-built factory at Cheshunt in 1959 and since 1966 the company has occupied a modern factory and road test facility at Hethel, near Wymondham in Norfolk. The site is a former World War II airfield, RAF Hethel, and the test track uses sections of the old runway.

In its early days, Lotus sold cars aimed at privateer racers and trialists. Its early road cars could be bought as kits, in order to save on purchase tax.   The kit car era ended in the late 1960s and early 1970s, the Lotus Elan Plus Two being the first Lotus road car not to be offered in kit form, and the Lotus Eclat and Lotus Elite of the mid-1970s being offered only in factory built versions.

After the Lotus Elite of the 1950s, which featured a complete fibreglass monocoque fitted with built-in steel pickup points for mounting major components, Lotus found critical and sales success in the 1960s with the Lotus Elan two seater later developed to two plus two form.  Lotus was notable for its use of fibreglass bodies, backbone chassis, and overhead camshaft engines, initially supplied by Coventry Climax but later replaced by Lotus-Ford units (Ford block, Lotus head and twin cam valve gear).   Lotus worked with Ford on the Lotus Cortina, a successful sports saloon.

Another Lotus of the late 1960s and early 1970s was the two seater Lotus Europa, initially intended only for the European market, which paired a backbone chassis and lightweight body with a mid mounted Renault engine, later upgraded to the Lotus-Ford twin cam unit as used in the Elan.

The Lotus Seven, originating in the 1950s as a simple, lightweight open two seater continued in production into the early 70s.  Lotus then sold the rights to produce the Seven to Caterham, which has continued to produce the car since then.

By the mid-1970s, Lotus sought to move upmarket with the launch of the Elite and Eclat models, four seaters aimed at prosperous buyers, with features such as optional air conditioning and optional automatic transmissions.  The mid engined line continued with the Lotus Esprit, which was to prove one of the company's longest lived and most iconic models.  Lotus developed its own series of four cylinder DOHC engines, the Lotus 900 series, and later a V8, and turbocharged versions of the engines appeared in the Esprit.

Variants of the 900 series engine were supplied for the Jensen Healey sports car and the Sunbeam Lotus "hot hatchback".  In the 1980s, Lotus collaborated with Vauxhall Motors to produce the Lotus Carlton, the fastest roadgoing Vauxhall car.

Financial troubles, death of Chapman
By 1980, Group Lotus was in serious financial trouble. Production had dropped from 1,200 units per year to a mere 383. The combined reasons were that the world was in the middle of an economic recession and sales in the key United States market had virtually collapsed, along with limited development of the then model range.

In early 1982, Chapman came to an agreement with Toyota to exchange intellectual property and applied expertise. This initially resulted in Lotus Engineering helping to develop the Mk2 Toyota Supra, also known as the Toyota Celica XX. Secondly, it allowed Lotus to launch the new Lotus Excel to replace the ageing Lotus Eclat. Using drivetrain and other components from Toyota enabled Lotus to sell the Excel for £1,109 less than the outgoing Eclat.

Looking to re-enter the North American market, Chapman was approached by young law professor and investment banking consultant, Joe Bianco, who proposed a new and separate United States sales company for Lotus. By creating an unprecedented tax-incentived mechanism wherein each investor received a specially personalised Lotus Turbo Esprit, the new American company, Lotus Performance Cars Inc. (LPCI), was able to provide fresh capital to the Group Lotus in the United Kingdom. Former Ferrari North America general manager John Spiech was brought in to run LPCI, which imported the remarkable Giugiaro-designed Turbo Esprit for the first time. US sales began to quickly jump into triple digits annually.

Chapman died of a heart attack on 16 December 1982 at the age of 54, having begun life as an innkeeper's son and ended a multi-millionaire industrialist in post-war Britain. At the time of his death, the car maker had built thousands of successful racing and road cars and won the Formula One World Championship seven times.

At the time of his death, both Chapman and Lotus were linked with the DeLorean Motor Company scandal over the use of UK Government subsidies for the production of the DMC DeLorean, for which Lotus had designed the chassis. Chasing large sums of money which had disappeared from the DeLorean company, Lotus was besieged by Inland Revenue inspectors, who imposed an £84 million legal "protective assessment" on the company.  Chapman died before the full deceit unravelled but, at the subsequent trial of Fred Bushell, the Lotus accountant, the judge insisted that had Chapman himself been in the dock, he would have received a sentence "of at least 10 years".

With Group Lotus near bankruptcy in 1983, David Wickins, the founder of British Car Auctions, agreed to become the new company chairman, through an introduction from his friend Mark Thatcher. Taking a combined 29% BCA/personal stake in Group Lotus, Wickins negotiated with the Inland Revenue, and then brought in new investors: merchant bank Schroeder-Wagg (14%); Michael Ashcroft's Bermudian operating company Benor (14%); Sir Anthony Bamford of JCB (12%). Wickins oversaw a complete turnaround in the company's fortunes, which resulted in him being called "The saviour of Lotus".

International ownership

Despite having employed designer Peter Stevens to revamp the range and design two new concept cars, by 1985 the British investors recognised that they lacked the required capital to invest in the required new model development to production, and sought to find a major motor manufacturing buyer. In January 1986, Wickins oversaw the majority sale of the Group Lotus companies and 100% of North American–based LPCI to General Motors, with engineer Bob Eaton a big Lotus car fan. After four months' control of Group Lotus by the co-owners GM and Toyota, the latter sold GM its stake. By October 1986, GM had acquired a 91% stake in Group Lotus for £22.7 million, which allowed GM to legally force the company buyout.

On 27 August 1993, GM sold the company, for £30 million, to A.C.B.N. Holdings S.A. of Luxembourg, a company controlled by Italian businessman Romano Artioli, who also owned Bugatti Automobili SpA. In 1996, a majority share in Lotus was sold to Proton, a Malaysian car company listed on the Kuala Lumpur Stock Exchange.

Lotus Cars were awarded the Queen's Award for Enterprise for contribution to International Trade, one of 85 companies receiving the recognition in that category in 2002. Lotus cars wore the badge of the award for a number of years.

On 24 May 2017, Chinese multinational Geely announced that was taking a 51% controlling stake in Lotus. The remaining 49% were acquired by Etika Automotive, a holding company of Proton's major shareholder Syed Mokhtar Albukhary.

In January 2021 Lotus' parent company Geely announced a joint venture with Renault–Nissan–Mitsubishi Alliance and their Alpine division to develop a range of electric performance cars sharing some of their future platforms. In April 2021 Lotus announced plans to produce only electric cars by 2028 and increase production numbers from around 1,500 per annum to tens of thousands. Geely and Etika Automotive provided two billion pounds (US$2.8 billion) to fund the changes.

Operations
Currently organised as Group Lotus plc, the business is divided into Lotus Cars and Lotus Engineering.

As well as sports car manufacture, the company also acts as an engineering consultancy, providing engineering development—particularly of suspensions- for other car manufacturers. Lotus's powertrain department is responsible for the design and development of the 4-cylinder Ecotec engine found in many of GM's Vauxhall, Opel, Saab, Chevrolet and Saturn cars. The US Lotus Elise and Exige models used the 1.8L VVTL-i I4 from Toyota's late Celica GT-S and the Matrix XRS both of which are no longer available new. The new Exige has the same V6 engine as its bigger counterpart the Evora and is not available in the US as a road-legal vehicle.

Michael Kimberley, who had been a guiding figure at Lotus in the 1970s, returned and took over as the Acting chief executive officer of the Company and its Group from May 2006. He chaired the executive committee of Lotus Group International Limited ("LGIL") established in February 2006, with Syed Zainal Abidin (managing director of Proton Holdings Berhad) and Badrul Feisal (non-executive director of Proton Holdings Berhad). LGIL is the holding company of Lotus Group Plc.

Kimberley retired as CEO on 17 July 2009, replaced on 1 October 2009 by the former Senior Vice-president for Commercial & Brand at Ferrari, Dany Bahar. Bahar intended to drive the brand up-market into the expanding global luxury goods sector, effectively away from the company's traditional light weight simplicity and pure driving experience focus.

Bahar was suspended as CEO on 25 May 2012 on a temporary basis, while an investigation into his conduct was undertaken. Lotus announced on 7 June 2012 the termination of Bahar's employment and the appointment of Aslam Farikullah as the new chief operating officer.  The ambitious plans for several new models were subsequently cancelled following Bahar's departure. Jean Marc Gales replaced Bahar as the CEO of the company in 2014 and enabled the company to make a profit after decades in 2017, due to his effective market plans and strategies before he left the company in June 2018 due to personal reasons, and was replaced by Feng Qingfeng from Lotus Group's parent company, Geely.

October 2018 saw further senior personnel changes as Phil Popham was named CEO of Lotus Cars, with Feng Qingfeng remaining in charge of Group Lotus.

In January 2021 Matt Windle was appointed managing director of Lotus Cars after Phil Popham stepped down.

Formula One and motorsport 

In its early days, the company encouraged its customers to race its cars, and it first entered Formula One through its sister company Team Lotus in 1958. A Lotus Formula One car driven by Stirling Moss won the marque's first Grand Prix in 1960 at Monaco.  Moss drove a Lotus 18 entered by privateer Rob Walker. Major success came in 1963 with the Lotus 25, which – with Jim Clark driving – won Team Lotus its first F1 World Constructors' Championship. Clark's untimely death – he crashed a Formula Two Lotus 48 in April 1968 after his rear tyre failed in a turn in Hockenheim – was a severe blow to the team and to Formula One. He was the dominant driver in the dominant car and remains an inseparable part of Lotus's early years. That year's championship was won by Clark's teammate, Graham Hill.

Team Lotus is credited with making the mid-engined layout popular for IndyCars, developing the first monocoque Formula One chassis, and the integration of the engine and transaxle as chassis components. Team Lotus was also among the pioneers in Formula One in adding wings and shaping the undersurface of the car to create downforce, as well as the first to move radiators to the sides of the car to aid in aerodynamic performance and inventing active suspension.

Even after Chapman's death, until the late 1980s, Team Lotus continued to be a major player in Formula One. Ayrton Senna drove for the team from 1985 to 1987, winning twice in each year and achieving 17 pole positions. By the company's last Formula One race in 1994, the cars were no longer competitive. Team Lotus constructed cars won a total of 79 Grand Prix races. During his lifetime Chapman saw Lotus beat Ferrari as the first Marque to achieve 50 Grand Prix victories, despite Ferrari having won their first nine years sooner.

Formula One Drivers' Championship winner for Lotus  were Jim Clark in 1963 and 1965, Graham Hill in 1968,  Jochen Rindt in 1970,  Emerson Fittipaldi in 1972 and Mario Andretti in 1978. In 1973 Lotus won  the constructors' championship only; the drivers' title went to Jackie Stewart of Tyrrell.

Team Lotus established Classic Team Lotus in 1992, as the Works historic motorsport activity.  Classic Team Lotus continues to maintain Lotus F1 cars and run them in the FIA Historic Formula One Championship and it preserves the Team Lotus archive and Works Collection of cars, under the management of Colin Chapman's son, Clive.

Team Lotus's participation in Formula One ended at the end of the 1994 season. Former racing driver David Hunt (brother of F1 world champion James Hunt) purchased the name 'Team Lotus' and licensed it to the Formula One team Pacific Racing, which was rebranded Pacific Team Lotus. The Pacific Team folded at the end of the 1995 season.

The Lotus name returned to Formula One for the 2010 season, when a new Malaysian team called Lotus Racing was awarded an entry. The new team used the Lotus name under licence from Group Lotus and was unrelated to the original Team Lotus. In September 2010 Group Lotus, with agreement from its parent company Proton, terminated the licence for future seasons as a result of what it called "flagrant and persistent breaches of the licence by the team". Lotus Racing then announced that it had acquired Team Lotus Ventures Ltd, the company led by David Hunt, and with it full ownership of the rights to the "Team Lotus" brand and heritage. The team confirmed that it would be known as Team Lotus from 2011 onwards.

In December 2010 Group Lotus announced the creation of Lotus Renault GP, the successor to the Renault F1 team.  This team contested the 2011 season having purchased a title sponsorship deal with the team, with the option to buy shares in the future. The team's car for that season, the R31, was badged as a Renault, while Team Lotus's car, the T128, was badged as a Lotus. In May 2011, the British High Court of Justice ruled that Team Lotus could continue to use the "Team Lotus" name, but Group Lotus had sole right to use the "Lotus" name on its own. As a consequence, for  Lotus Renault GP was rebranded as Lotus F1 Team and its cars were badged as Lotuses, while Team Lotus was renamed Caterham F1 Team (after the sports car manufacturer owned by team principal Tony Fernandes) and its cars were badged as Caterhams.

Group Lotus was also involved in several other categories of motorsport. It sponsored the KV team in the IndyCar Series and used to sponsor the ART team in the GP2 and GP3 Series in 2011 and 2012. In 2011, Lotus also returned to the 24 Hours of Le Mans with a semi-works effort run by Jetalliance Racing, which fielded two Lotus Evoras.

After fielding underpowered and uncompetitive engines in the 2012 Indianapolis 500, in which drivers Jean Alesi and Simona de Silvestro were black-flagged after ten laps for failing to maintain a competitive pace, Lotus was released from its contract and did not participate in future seasons.

Lotus car models

Current
Current Lotus models include:
 Lotus Evija: The Lotus Evija is a limited production electric sports car, it is the first electric vehicle to be introduced and manufactured by the company. Codenamed "Type 130", production of the Evija will be limited to 130 units. Production is set to begin early-mid 2021 with delivery in early 2023. The Evija is powered by a 70 kWh battery pack developed in conjunction with Williams Advanced Engineering, with electric motors supplied by Integral Powertrain.
Lotus Emira: Unveiled July 2021, production began March 2022 - this will be the firm's final vehicle powered by an internal combustion engine.
Lotus Eletre: The first high-performance electric SUV from Lotus.

Previous 

 Lotus Mark I (1948): Austin 7–based sports car
 Lotus Mark II (1949–1950): Ford-powered trials car
 Lotus Mark III (1951): 750 cc formula car
 Lotus Mark IV (1952): Trials car
 Lotus Mark V (1952): 750 cc formula car, never built
 Lotus Mark VI (1953–1955): The first "production" racer, about 100 built
 Lotus Seven (1957–1972): A minimalist open sports car designed to manoeuvre a racing circuit.
 Lotus Mark VIII (1954): sports racer, MG 1.5 L
 Lotus Mark IX (1955): sports racer, shorter and improved Eight
 Lotus Mark X (1955): sports racer for larger displacement, Bristol/BMW 2 L
 Lotus Eleven (1956–1957): small displacement sports racer (750 – 1500 cc)
 Lotus 12 (1956–1957): Formula Two and Formula One racecar
 Lotus 13: Designation not used
 Lotus 14 (1957–1963): Lotus Elite, the first production street car
 Lotus 15 (1958–1960): Sports racer, update of the Mk.X, Climax 1.5 – 2.5 L
 Lotus 16 (1958–1959): F1/F2 car, "Miniature Vanwall"
 Lotus 17 (1959): Lighter sports racer update of the 11 in response to Lola Mk.I
 Lotus 18 (1960–1961): First mid-engined Lotus single seater—Formula Junior/F2/F1
 Lotus 19 (1960–1962): Mid-engined larger displacement sports racer, "Monte Carlo"
 Lotus 20 (1961): Formula Junior
 Lotus 21 (1961): Formula One
 Lotus 22 (1962–1965): Formula Junior/F3
 Lotus 23 (1962–1966): Small displacement mid-engined sports racer
 Lotus 24 (1962): Formula One
 Lotus 25 (1962–1964): Formula One World Champion
 Lotus 26 (1962–1971): Lotus Elan, production street sports car
 Lotus 26R (1962–1966): Racing version of Elan
 Lotus 27 (1963): Formula Junior
 Lotus 28 (1963–1966): Lotus version of the Ford Cortina street/racer
 Lotus 29 (1963): Indy car, Ford all-aluminium OHV small block V8
 Lotus 30 (1964): Large displacement sports racer (Ford small block V8)
 Lotus 31 (1964–1966): Formula Three space frame racer
 Lotus 32 (1964–1965): Monocoque F2 and Tasman Cup racer
 Lotus 33 (1964–1965): Formula One World Champion
 Lotus 34 (1964): Indy car, DOHC Ford V8
 Lotus 35 (1965): F2/F3/FB
 Lotus 36 (1965–1968): Elan Fixed Head Coupe (Type 26 could be fitted with a removable hard top)
 Lotus 38 (1965): Indy winning mid-engined car
 Lotus 39 (1965–1966): Tasman Cup formula car
 Lotus 40 (1965): Sports racer, a development of the 30
 Lotus 41 (1965–1968): Formula Three, Formula Two, Formula B
 Lotus 42 (1967): Indy car, Ford V8
 Lotus 43 (1966): Formula One
 Lotus 44 (1967): Formula Two
 Lotus 45 (1966–1974): Convertible (Drop Head Coupe) Elan with permanent side window frames.
 Lotus 46 (1966–1968): Original Renault-engined Europa
 Lotus 47 (1966–1970): Racing version of Europa
 Lotus 48 (1967): Formula Two
 Lotus 49 (1967–1969): Formula One World Champion
 Lotus 50 (1967–1974): Lotus Elan +2, four-seat production car
 Lotus 51 (1967–1969): Formula Ford
 Lotus 52 (1968): Prototype Europa Twin Cam
 Lotus 53 (1968): Small displacement sports racer, never built
 Lotus 54 (1968–1970): Series 2 'Europa' production car.
 Lotus 55 (1968): F3
 Lotus 56 (1968–1969): Indy turbine wedge
 Lotus 56B (1971): F1 turbine wedge
 Lotus 57 (1968): F2 design study
 Lotus 58 (1968): F1 design study
 Lotus 59 (1969–1970): F2/F3/Formula Ford
 Lotus LX (1960): Lotus Elite built to win at Le Mans with a 2.0 L FPF engine.
 Lotus 60 (1970–1973): Lotus Seven S4, Greatly modified version of the Seven
 Lotus 61 (1969): Formula Ford, "the wedge"
 Lotus 62 (1969): prototype Europa racer
 Lotus 63 (1969): 4-wheel drive F1
 Lotus 64 (1969): 4-wheel drive Indy car, did not compete
 Lotus 65 (1969–1971): Federalized Europa S2
 Lotus 66: Can-Am design study
 Lotus 67 (1970): Proposed Tasman Cup car, never built
 Lotus 68 (1969): F5000 prototype
 Lotus 69 (1970): F2/F3/Formula Ford
 Lotus 70 (1970): F5000/Formula A
 Lotus 71: Undisclosed design study
 Lotus 72 (1970–1972): Formula One World Champion
 Lotus 73 (1972–1973): F3
 Lotus 74 - Texaco Star (1973): F2
 Lotus 74 (1971–1975): Europa Twin Cam production car
 Lotus 75 (1974–1982): Elite II, Luxury 4-seat GT
 Lotus 76 (1974): F1, redundant designation
 Lotus 76 (1975–1982): Éclat S1, fastback version of Elite II, redundant designation
 Lotus 77 (1976): F1
 Lotus 78 (1977–1978): F1 ground effects car
 Lotus 79 (1975–1980) Lotus Esprit, street GT, redundant designation
 Lotus 79 (1978–1979): Formula One World Champion, redundant designation
 Lotus 80 (1979): F1
 Lotus 81 (1979–1980): Sunbeam Talbot Lotus, redundant designation
 Lotus 81 (1980–1981): F1, redundant designation
 Lotus 82 (1982–1987): Turbo Esprit, street GT car
 Lotus 83 (1980): Elite series 2
 Lotus 84 (1980–1982): Éclat series 2
 Lotus 85 (1980–1987): Esprit series 3
 Lotus 86 (1980–1983): F1 dual chassis, never raced
 Lotus 87 (1980–1982): F1
 Lotus 88 (1981): F1 dual chassis car, banned
 Lotus 89 (1982–1992): Lotus Excel GT, re-engineered Éclat
 Lotus M90/X100: Toyota-based "new Elan", abandoned in favour of the Elan M100
 Lotus 91 (1982): F1
 Lotus 92 (1983): F1
 Lotus 93T (1983): F1 Turbo
 Lotus 94T (1983): F1 Turbo
 Lotus 95T (1984): F1 Turbo
 Lotus 96T (1984): Indy car project, abandoned
 Lotus 97T (1985–1986): F1 Turbo
 Lotus 98T (1986–1987): F1 Turbo
 Lotus 99T (1987): F1 Turbo, last Lotus F1 winner
 Lotus 100T (1988): F1 Turbo
 Lotus Elan (Type M100) (1989–1995): Front-drive convertible Elan.
 Lotus 101 (1989): F1
 Lotus 102 (1990–1991): F1
 Lotus 103 (1990): F1, not produced
 Lotus 104 (1990–1992): Lotus Carlton/Omega, tuned version of the Opel/Vauxhall saloon.
 Lotus 105 (1990): Racing X180R, IMSA Supercars Drivers Champ (Doc Bundy)
 Lotus 106 (1991): X180R, roadgoing homologation special
 Lotus 107 (1992–1994): F1
 Lotus 108 (1992): a track only bike ridden by Chris Boardman to win a gold medal at the 1992 Barcelona Olympics, also known as the "LotusSport Pursuit Bicycle".
 Lotus 109 (1994): F1, Last Lotus F1 car.
 Lotus 110 : Road and TT bike. Often mistaken for the Lotus 108 but completely different bikes.
 Lotus 111 (1996–2022): Lotus Elise
 Lotus 112: Partial F1 design, reached as far as the monocoque buck
 Lotus 113: Number not allocated
 Lotus 114 (1996): Lotus Esprit GT1 race car
 Lotus 115 (1997–1998): Lotus Elise GT1 
 Lotus 116: Opel Speedster/Vauxhall VX220, a collaboration with Opel
 Lotus 117: Lotus Elise S2
 Lotus 118: Lotus M250, two-seat mid-range sports car concept unveiled in Autumn of 1999, project cancelled in 2001
 Lotus 119 (2002): Soapbox Derby car made of carbon and aluminium, disc brakes, no engine, for Goodwood Festival of Speed
 Lotus 120 (1998-2022): Elise V6, code named M120, never produced
 Lotus 121 (2000–2022): Lotus Exige
 Lotus 121 (2006): Europa S
 Lotus 122 (2007–2011): Lotus 2-Eleven, 0-door speedster
 Lotus 123 (2010–2022): Lotus Evora
 Lotus 124: Lotus Evora, race car
 Lotus T125 (2010): Lotus Exos
 Lotus T127 (2010): Team Lotus F1 car, made for 2010 season
 Lotus T128 (Formula One car) (2011): Team Lotus F1 car, made for 2011 season
 Lotus T128 (Le Mans Prototype) (2013): race car built for 24 Hours of LeMans
 Lotus 129 (2016–2022): Lotus 3-Eleven, 0-door speedster
 Lotus 130 (2021–): Lotus Evija, all-electric hypercar
 Lotus 131 (2022–): Lotus Emira, revealed 6 July 2021
 Lotus 132 (2023–): Lotus Eletre, Electric Hyper SUV, teased 8 November 2021 by Lotus, debuted 29/03/2022, becoming a new competitor in the rapidly expanding premium electric SUV segment.
 Lotus 133 (2024–): Sedan, all-electric four-door super saloon
 Lotus 134 (2025–): Mid-size SUV, all-electric
 Lotus 135 (2026–): Sports car, all-electric supercar
The Elise has spawned several racing variants, including a limited series called the 340R, which has an open-body design echoing the old Seven. The Elise was introduced into the US, with a Toyota engine, to pass strict US emissions laws. The 1ZZ & 2ZZ Toyota engines used to have a Lotus ECU with their own fuel mapping. The supercharged Lotus Elise S (which replaced the SC model) and limited edition Jim Clark Type 25 Elise editions add a new performance dimension to the Elise range. 0– acceleration is in 4.3 seconds and 0– in 4.6 seconds. The Elise spawned into its third generation in 2012 where it saw more power being added and more newer variants such as the Elise Cup 250 being introduced.
 Lotus Exige: The coupé version of the Elise which is in production since 2000. Currently the Exige has a variety of variants ranging from the  Sport 350 to the  Cup 430. All variants of the Exige feature the Supercharged Toyota DOHC V6 from the Lotus Evora.
 Lotus Evora: The Lotus Evora was unveiled on 22 July 2008. It was code named Project Eagle during development. The Evora is 2+2 sports car with a mid-mounted, transverse 3.5-litre V6 engine. Lotus unveiled a more powerful variant of the Evora called the Evora S in 2011 which Lotus provided as Rapid Response Vehicles to the Rome and Milan Carabinieri to replace the previous Lamborghini Gallardos. A facelifted and more powerful Evora 400 model was unveiled at the 2015 Geneva Motor Show after Lotus discontinued the standard Evora and the Evora S. The Evora 400 was followed up by the Evora Sport 410 which was unveiled at the 2016 Geneva Motor Show. Another powerful variant called the Evora GT430 was unveiled in September 2017.

Announcements of future cars 

At the 2010 Paris Motorshow, Lotus announced five new models to be introduced over the next five years: Their intention was to replace the Elise with an entirely different model, as well as to introduce two entirely new sports coupes, which would have been known as the Elite and the Elan, a new sports saloon, the Eterne, to rival the Aston Martin Rapide and Maserati Quattroporte, and a modern interpretation of the Esprit supercar.

It became apparent in July 2012 that the firm's financial difficulties had made this plan impossible to implement, and initially all but the Esprit project were cancelled. Subsequently, the Esprit project was also cancelled.

Lotus also showed an unnamed city car concept using its 1.2L range-extender engine.
In 2011, Lotus revealed this as the Lotus Ethos, a plug-in hybrid car based on the EMAS concept from its parent company Proton, and likely to be primarily built by Proton in Malaysia.  This car has also been cancelled.

Lotus CEO at the time Jean Marc Gales confirmed in 2017 that development of an SUV is currently under way, after the company was acquired by the Chinese automotive manufacturer, Geely.

In January 2021, Lotus teased that the Elise, Exige, and Evora will be discontinued and be replaced by the Type 131 which had yet to be released at the time of announcement. In July 2021, Lotus revealed that this new model will be called Emira.

In November 2021, Lotus teased the future introduction of the future Type 132 SUV.

Lotus engines 
 Lotus-Ford Twin Cam
 Lotus 900 series
 Lotus 907
 Lotus 910
 Lotus 911
 Lotus 912
 Lotus 920
 Lotus 918
 Range Extender Engine. This all-aluminium, monoblock, 1200 cc, three-cylinder, 47 horsepower, four-stroke engine is specifically designed to directly drive an alternator for electricity generation for series-hybrid cars. The cylinder head and engine block are all one casting to reduce size, weight and production costs. As the engine does not turn belt driven ancillaries such as alternator, power-steering pump or an air conditioning compressor, the block requires no strong points to accommodate such ancillaries, resulting in a simple and light block. The engine has a reduced parts count for lightness and cheaper production.
 On 18 August 2011 Lotus developed an all new in-house designed V8 destined for the new era range of cars. The engine is being utilised as a stressed component, a technique pioneered by Colin Chapman in F1, specifically with the 1967 Type 49. It was expected to be used in the Le Mans LMP2 car in 2012.
 Lotus Omnivore, research engine and prototype.

Lotus Engineering 
Lotus Engineering Limited is an offshoot of Lotus Cars, which provides engineering consultancy to third-party companies primarily in the automotive industry. As well as Hethel in the United Kingdom Lotus has engineering centres in Ann Arbor, USA, Kuala Lumpur, Malaysia and Shanghai, China. In 2000, Lotus Engineering, Inc. was established with an office in Ann Arbor, Michigan.

Engineering demonstrators
Lotus Eco Elise is an engineering demonstrator of its classic sports car that incorporates solar panels into a roof made from hemp, while also employing natural materials in the body and interior of the car.
Lotus Exige 265E Bio-fuel
Lotus Exige 270E Tri-fuel
Lotus Evora 414E Hybrid.  Shown at the 2010 Geneva Motor show
Lotus Concept City Car.  Shown at the 2010 Paris motor show.

APX and VVA

The APX (also known as the "Aluminium Performance Crossover") is an aluminium concept vehicle revealed at the 2006 Geneva Motor Show built on Lotus Engineering's Versatile Vehicle Architecture (VVA).

Whereas the VVA technology was to be used in the development of a new mid-engine sportscar for Lotus cars, the APX is, in fact, a high-performance 7-seat MPV with four-wheel drive and a front-mounted V6 engine from Lotus Engineering's Powertrain division. The engine was designed and developed to be available in a 2.2-litre naturally aspirated and 3.0-litre supercharged variations. An electric version was also shown in the 2007 NADA show.

Versatile Vehicle Architecture (VVA) is an effort by the Lotus car manufacturing company to reduce the investment needed for producing unique, niche-market cars by sharing a number of common components.

Cars produced using VVA:
 Lotus APX

Projects undertaken by Lotus Engineering 

Examples of work undertaken by Lotus Engineering include:

 Lotus Talbot Sunbeam—Talbot's hot hatch rally car of the early 1980s
 DMC DeLorean. Changes to the original concept led to considerable schedule pressures. The car was deemed to require almost complete re-engineering, which was turned over to engineer Colin Chapman, founder of Lotus. Lotus replaced most of the unproven material and manufacturing techniques with those then employed by Lotus in the Lotus Esprit
 Vauxhall Lotus Carlton (also Opel Lotus Omega, internal name Lotus Type 104) – At the time (early 1990s) this was the fastest saloon car available, with a top speed of over 175 mph (280 km/h)
The 1991 Dodge Spirit R/T with a version of the 2.2 L K-car engine with a 16-valve DOHC head designed by Lotus with over 
 Vauxhall VX220 (badged Opel Speedster outside of the UK) – Lotus produced and based the car upon the same aluminium chassis design as the Lotus Elise. Production of these models ended in 2005
 Lotus styled and assisted with the engineering of the Tesla Roadster, an electric sports car based on the Elise, as well as licensing some technologies to Tesla Motors and constructing the Roadster at their plant in Hethel.
 The Aston Martin DB9's chassis was developed with the help of Lotus Engineering
 Lotus was responsible for most of the design, development, and testing, of the LT5 DOHC V8 powerplant for the Chevrolet Corvette C4 ZR-1
 Lotus designed, developed and tested the GM Ecotec engine and its variants
 Lotus was responsible for various aspects of the Sinclair C5 electric tricycle
 Lotus was responsible for the suspension calibration of the Toyota MR2 Mk. I, the Toyota Supra Mk. II and Mk. III, the Isuzu Piazza, the Isuzu Impulse as well as newer Proton models
 Lotus did engineering work on the PROTON Satria GTi model
 Lotus was responsible for the development of the Campro engine together with Proton, as well as its variable valve timing system, the Cam Profile Switching (CPS). Currently available in the 1.6-litre and 1.3-litre variants, the Campro engine now powers most of Proton's newer models
 Lotus has worked on the suspension of the Mahindra Scorpio to make it more stable at high speeds
 Lotus produced the revised chassis of the Isuzu Piazza
 Lotus has worked on the suspension and handling of the Volvo 480
 The Dodge EV concept electric vehicle from Chrysler is based on a Lotus Europa S
 Lotus has worked on the suspension and handling of the Nissan GT-R
 Lotus rebuilt, modified, and tuned a Lada Riva on Top Gear season 1, episode 8. 
 The 2006 Volkswagen GX3 features a chassis developed by Lotus for VW
 The 2009 Kia Soul features Lotus tuned suspension (UK only)
 2010: Limo-Green project with Jaguar Cars. Lotus provided the Range Extender engine for a prototype XJ series-hybrid car. The car returned 58 mpg (imperial) running off the range extender alone
 Lotus partnered with Jaguar for developing chassis system and engine management of the Jaguar C-X75.
 Lotus has worked on handling and steering of the 2015 Hyundai Genesis.
 The 2015 Spyker B6 Venator is powered by a Lotus-built engine originating from a Toyota-sourced block.
 The Baojun 730, a Chinese minivan with Lotus-tuned suspension, built by a General Motors subsidiary.
 HB.T, a track bicycle with a novel aerodynamic design; produced in collaboration with Hope Technology and British Cycling.

Lotus based cars 
 Detroit Electric SP.01, based on Elise chassis
 Hennessey Venom GT, based on the Exige/Elise chassis
 Infiniti Emerg-e concept car, based on Evora 414E
 Melkus RS2000, based on Elise chassis
 Rinspeed sQuba concept car, based on Elise chassis
 Tesla Roadster, based on Elise chassis
 Vauxhall VX220/Opel Speedster, based on the Elise

Electric vehicles

Evija

Lotus unveiled their first production electric hypercar called the Evija in July 2019, production would be limited to 130 units and is scheduled to begin in Summer 2020 and is being delivered to customers in early 2023. The car was undergoing development under the codename Type 130. The Evija makes use of a 70 kWh battery pack developed in conjunction with Williams Advanced Engineering. There are 4 electric motors placed on each wheel supported by an Integral powertrain.

Other Cars
The Tesla Roadster is based on the Elise chassis. On July 11, 2005, Tesla and Lotus entered an agreement about products and services based on the Lotus Elise, where Lotus provided advice on designing and developing a vehicle as well as producing partly assembled vehicles.

Lotus Engineering has established a group dedicated to hybrid and electric vehicles.

Lotus Engineering developed the Evora 414E as their first hybrid concept car. Featuring a total hybrid range of more than 300 miles.

Lotus joined Jaguar Cars, MIRA Ltd and Caparo on a luxury hybrid executive sedan project called "Limo-Green"—funded by the UK Government Technology Strategy Board. The vehicle will be a series plug-in hybrid.

See also 

 List of car manufacturers of the United Kingdom

Further reading 
 Gérard ("Jabby") Crombac, Colin Chapman: The Man and His Cars (Patrick Stephens, Wellingborough, 1986)
 Mike Lawrence, Colin Chapman: The Wayward Genius (Breedon Books, Derby, 2002)
 Ian H. Smith, The Story of Lotus: 1947–1960 Birth of a Legend (republished Motor Racing Publications, Chiswick, 1972)
 Doug Nye, The Story of Lotus: 1961–1971 Growth of a Legend (Motor Racing Publications, Chiswick, 1972)
 Robin Read, Colin Chapman's Lotus: The Early Years, the Elite and the Origins of the Elan (Haynes, Sparkford, 1989)
 Anthony Pritchard, Lotus: All the Cars (Aston Publications, Bourne End, 1990)
 Doug Nye, Theme Lotus: 1956–1986 (Motor Racing Publications, Croydon, 1986)
 William Taylor The Lotus Book (Coterie Press, Luton, 1998, 1999, 2005)
 William Taylor The Lotus Book Collectibles (Coterie Press, Luton, 2000)
 Peter Ross, Lotus: The Early Years 1951–54 (Coterie Press, Luton, 2004)
 Rémy Solnon, Lotus Esprit – le grand tourisme à l'anglaise (Editions Les Presses Littéraires, 2007)
 Andrew Ferguson, Team Lotus: The Indianapolis Years (Haynes Publishing 1996) no longer available

References

External links 

 

 
1952 establishments in England
British companies established in 1952
Car brands
Car manufacturers of the United Kingdom
Companies based in Norfolk
Electric vehicle manufacturers of the United Kingdom
English brands
Joint ventures
Motor vehicle manufacturers of England
South Norfolk
Sports car manufacturers
Vehicle manufacture in London
Vehicle manufacturing companies established in 1952

az:Lotus